The Hispano HS-42 and its derivative, the HA-43, were advanced military trainer aircraft produced in Spain in the 1940s. The basic design was that of a conventional, low-wing, cantilever monoplane with seating for the pilot and instructor in tandem. The HS-42 had fixed, tailwheel undercarriage with spatted mainwheels, while the HA-43 had retractable main units. Produced on the assembly line that had been used to build Fokker D.XXI fighters, the HS-42 shared some components with this aircraft.

Variants
HS-42
Original production version with fixed undercarriage and Piaggio Stella P.VII C.16 engine
HA-43
Improved variant with retractable undercarriage and Armstrong Siddeley Cheetah 27 engine

Operators

Spanish Air Force

Specifications (HA-43)

References

 
 
 

1940s Spanish military trainer aircraft
Hispano aircraft